The Golden Year may refer to:

 The Golden Year (album), the sole album by the group Ou Est le Swimming Pool
 The Golden Year (BBC TV play), a musical comedy of 1951 starring Jack Hulbert

See also
Golden Years (disambiguation)